Bradley Air Services, operating as Canadian North, is a wholly Inuit-owned airline headquartered in Kanata, Ontario, Canada. It operates scheduled passenger services to communities in the Northwest Territories, Nunavut and the Nunavik region of Quebec, as well as southern destinations such as Edmonton, Montreal and Ottawa.  The company slogan is Fly the Arctic.

History

First Air, originally Bradley Air Services, was founded by Canadian aviation pioneer Russel (Russ) Bradley, started operations in 1946 and is still registered under that name. Beginning as a flying school in Carp, Ontario, First Air started scheduled operations in 1973 between Ottawa and North Bay, Ontario. This service was operated with an eight-seat passenger plane.

Canadian North was established in 1989 as a subsidiary of Canadian Airlines International, specifically to serve northern Canadian communities' needs. The airline traces its roots to former operators Nordair in the Eastern Arctic, and Pacific Western Airlines in the West. Wardair also maintained a significant Arctic presence during its existence.

In September, 1998, Canadian North was renamed Air Norterra, whose ownership was divided equally among the Inuvialuit Development Corporation, representing the Inuvialuit people of the western Canadian Arctic, and Nunasi Corporation, representing the Inuit of Nunavut.
 
After utilizing three different livery schemes, the airline adopted its final pre-merger logo in 2003. Its logo displays three of the distinctive symbols of the North: the polar bear, the midnight sun and the Northern Lights. Canadian North's slogan was changed from "Your North. Your Airline" to "seriously northern" (all in lower-case), with advertising changed to reflect different aspects of the company (serious service, serious delivery, etc.).

In June, 2007, Canadian North began serving the Kitikmeot communities of Gjoa Haven, Taloyoak, Kugaaruk, and Kugluktuk. In April, 2008, flights began to seven communities in the Qikiqtaaluk Region (Baffin Region) of Nunavut.

On April 1, 2014, the Inuvialuit Development Corporation (IDC), representing the Inuvialuit of the Inuvialuit Settlement Region, bought the 50% share of NorTerra held by Nunasi. This purchase of NorTerra gave the IDC complete control of Canadian North Northern Transportation Company and other companies that were jointly-held. On April 11, 2014, Norterra and the Makivik Corporation, owners of First Air announced that they were in negotiations to merge the two airlines.  According to a website that had been set up on that same day, the new airline would be owned equally between the two companies and "a merger would create a stronger, more sustainable business, provide better service to customers and lead to new economic development opportunities across the North. We believe the two companies would complement each other's strengths." In October, 2014, it was announced the merger would not go through, but Canadian North would still codeshare on some flights with First Air until 16 May 2017. On February 23, 2017, the Inuvialuit Development Corporation (IDC) announced that arrangements had been concluded to transfer ownership of Canadian North directly into Inuvialuit Development Corporation.

On September 28, 2018, Makivik Corporation and the Inuvialuit Corporate Group (ICG) signed a definitive agreement to merge Canadian North and First Air, again awaiting government approval. The new airline would use the new First Air livery, but would operate under the name "Canadian North". On June 19, 2019, the federal government gave approval to the merger provided several terms and conditions were met.

On November 1, 2019, First Air and Canadian North completed the merger and combined schedules into one, using the code 5T, dropping First Air's 7F code as well as the name but keeping the livery. In early 2021 the callsigns "First Air" and "Empress" were retired and the combined airline began operating as 5T/AKT, callsign "Arctic."

As of December 18, 2021, operations are now under the Canadian North name with a new livery.

Canadian North confirmed in December 2022 to retire their last Boeing 737-200 by early 2023, replacing it with turboprop aircraft with similar gravel runway capabilities.

Destinations

As of December 22, 2022, Canadian North has the following 28 domestic scheduled destinations:

Charter operations
Canadian North offers charters to anywhere, non-stop flights in continental North America and maintain charter terminals at Calgary and Edmonton.

Fleet

Current fleet
Over time the registration of the fleet has moved from Canadian North to Bradley Air Services (First Air). As of February 2023, the fleet consists of 34 aircraft all registered to Bradley Air Services.

Retired fleet

Aircraft previously operated include:
 Fokker F28 Fellowship (F.28 Mk 1000)
 Fokker 100 (listed by Transport Canada as a F.28 Mk 0100)
 De Havilland Canada Dash 8

Corporate affairs

The company headquarters are in Kanata, Ontario, the former First Air HQ.

Canadian North had its headquarters in the Northwest Tower, in downtown Yellowknife. The airline announced that when its lease was to expire in the end of August 2013, the airline would vacate the office and move it and 20 employees out of Yellowknife. The airline kept its community and marketing support employees in Yellowknife. Most of the employees who relocated were from the accounting division. Lisa Hicks, a spokesperson, stated that there had been excess capacity at the airline's offices in Edmonton and Yellowknife.

Canadian North headquarters were moved to the grounds of Calgary International Airport in Calgary, Alberta. In addition it has regional offices in Iqaluit, Nunavut, and in Yellowknife, Northwest Territories. It also has an operations office in Edmonton, Alberta, on the grounds of Edmonton International Airport.  Following the takeover by First Air, the former headquarters in Calgary was shut down and remaining management was transferred to Kanata.

Programs and services

Canadian North in-flight service includes leather seating, advanced seat selection, free newspapers and magazines, and free colouring books and crayons for children.

The airline offers Aeroplan rewards points, both to collect and to redeem. Passengers may redeem Air Miles points for travel on Canadian North. Canadian North has codeshare agreements with Air North and Calm Air.

Canadian North also has its own "Aurora Concierge" and Aurora Rewards program for frequent travellers. Benefits of being an Aurora Concierge member include: Priority check-in, baggage, and boarding, extra piece of checked luggage, free alcoholic beverages, no fee changes, personalized membership card and baggage tag, and more.

In 2005, the airline started offering a Pivut Fare ("ours") to beneficiaries of the Inuvialuit Final Agreement.

References

External links

Air Transport Association of Canada
Regional airlines of the Northwest Territories
Regional airlines of Nunavut
Airlines established in 1973
Airlines established in 1989
Companies based in the Northwest Territories
Inuvialuit companies
Regional airlines of Ontario
Companies based in Ottawa
Inuit transport
Cargo airlines of Canada
Canadian companies established in 1973
Canadian companies established in 1989